Polna may refer to:
Polná, a town in the Vysočina Region of the Czech Republic
Polná Affair, a series of anti-semitic trials around 1900
Polná (Hazlov), a village in Karlovy Vary Region, Czech Republic
Polna, Poland, a village in Lesser Poland Voivodeship, Poland
Polna, Russia, a rural locality (a village) in Gdovsky District of Pskov Oblast, Russia